Aliabad-e Chah Kavir (also Romanized as ‘Alīābād-e Chāh Kavīr; also known as ‘Alīābād) is a village in Dastgerdan Rural District, Dastgerdan District, Tabas County, South Khorasan Province, Iran. At the 2006 census, its population was 24, in 8 families.

References 

Populated places in Tabas County